Bayview (also, Bay View) is a census-designated place (CDP) located adjacent to the City of Eureka in Humboldt County, California, United States. Its population is 2,619 as of the 2020 census, up from 2,510 from the 2010 census. Many locals consider this area as part of "Pine Hill."

Geography

History
A post office operated at Bayview from 1925 to 1935.

Demographics

2010
The 2010 United States Census reported that Bayview had a population of 2,510. The racial makeup of Bayview was 1,959 (78.0%) White, 28 (1.1%) African American, 119 (4.7%) Native American, 88 (3.5%) Asian, 5 (0.2%) Pacific Islander, 185 (7.4%) from other races, and 126 (5.0%) from two or more races. Hispanic or Latino of any race were 425 persons (16.9%).

The Census reported that 2,489 people (99.2% of the population) lived in households, 10 (0.4%) lived in non-institutionalized group quarters, and 11 (0.4%) were institutionalized.

There were 1,023 households, out of which 333 (32.6%) had children under the age of 18 living in them, 369 (36.1%) were opposite-sex married couples living together, 167 (16.3%) had a female householder with no husband present, 66 (6.5%) had a male householder with no wife present. There were 112 (10.9%) unmarried opposite-sex partnerships, and 11 (1.1%) same-sex married couples or partnerships. 310 households (30.3%) were made up of individuals, and 100 (9.8%) had someone living alone who was 65 years of age or older. The average household size was 2.43. There were 602 families (58.8% of all households); the average family size was 3.06.

The population was spread out, with 601 people (23.9%) under the age of 18, 224 people (8.9%) aged 18 to 24, 714 people (28.4%) aged 25 to 44, 678 people (27.0%) aged 45 to 64, and 293 people (11.7%) who were 65 years of age or older. The median age was 36.2 years. For every 100 females, there were 96.9 males. For every 100 females age 18 and over, there were 95.8 males.

The homeowner vacancy rate was 1.4%; the rental vacancy rate was 2.3%. 1,565 people (62.4% of the population) lived in owner-occupied housing units and 924 people (36.8%) lived in rental housing units.

2000
As of the census of 2000, there were 2,359 people, 936 households, and 586 families residing in the CDP. The racial makeup of the CDP was 83.68% White, 0.59% Black or African American, 4.87% Native American, 2.16% Asian, 0.17% Pacific Islander, 3.65% from other races, and 4.87% from two or more races. 7.88% of the population were Hispanic or Latino of any race.

There were 936 households, out of which 30.8% had children under the age of 18 living with them, 42.6% were married couples living together, 13.7% had a female householder with no husband present, and 37.3% were non-families. 28.0% of all households were made up of individuals, and 8.7% had someone living alone who was 65 years of age or older. The average household size was 2.48 and the average family size was 3.00.

In the CDP, the population was spread out, with 25.1% under the age of 18, 9.7% from 18 to 24, 29.4% from 25 to 44, 23.0% from 45 to 64, and 12.7% who were 65 years of age or older. The median age was 36 years. For every 100 females, there were 97.4 males. For every 100 females age 18 and over, there were 98.0 males.

The median income for a household in the CDP was $26,023, and the median income for a family was $32,941. Males had a median income of $27,542 versus $22,463 for females. The per capita income for the CDP was $14,119. About 20.6% of families and 23.1% of the population were below the poverty line, including 33.9% of those under age 18 and 14.2% of those age 65 or over.

Politics

See also

References

Census-designated places in Humboldt County, California
Populated coastal places in California
Eureka, California
Census-designated places in California